Tieli (Chinese: 铁力; Pinyin: Tiělì; English: Iron Strength) is a county-level city in Heilongjiang Province, China, on the east bank of the Hulan River.

The city has a population of 235,158 (2010).

Tieli is under administration of the prefecture-level city of Yichun.

Administrative divisions 
Tieli City is divided into 4 towns, 2 townships and 1 ethnic township. 
4 towns
 Tieli, Shuangfeng, Taoshan, Shenshu
2 townships
 Gongnong, Wangyang
1 ethnic township
 Nianfeng Korean

Climate

References 

 
Cities in Heilongjiang
County level divisions of Heilongjiang
Yichun, Heilongjiang